All Because of You is the debut and only CCM studio album recorded by famous actress/author Lisa Whelchel, who is playing a character on The Facts of Life. Released in May 1984, this album was recorded on the Nissi Records label and was distributed by Sparrow Records.

Track listing
Side 1
  “Love Believer” – 3:42
  “Just Obey” – 4:06
  “How High, How Deep, How Wide” – 4:11
  “Real Possibility” – 4:05
  “Good Girl” – 3:55

Side 2
"Shelter” – 3:43
  “Set Me Free” – 4:12
  “Cover Me, Lord” – 3:52
  “All Because of You” – 3:32
  “He Sings Me to Sleep” – 4:52

Personnel
Credits are adapted from the All Because of You liner notes.

 Lisa Whelchel – lead vocals
 Smitty Price – keyboards
 John Rosasco – keyboards
 Rhett Lawrence – synthesizer programming
 Marty Walsh – guitars 
 Leon Gaer – bass
 John Patitucci – bass 
 John Ferraro – drums
 Bob Wilson – drums
 Brandon Fields – woodwinds 
 Sandy Hall – backing vocals
 Melissa MacKay – backing vocals
 Susan McBride – backing vocals
 Howard McCrary – backing vocals
 Linda McCrary – backing vocals
 Charity McCrary – backing vocals

Production
 Producer – John Rosasco
 Executive Producer – Bobby Cotton
 Engineers – Wally Grant, Tim Roberstad and Mike Ross.
 Mixing – Bobby Cotton and Wally Grant

Aftermath
The album reached #17 on the Billboard Contemporary Christian Music chart. It also was nominated for a Grammy Award for Best Inspiration Performance, ultimately losing to Donna Summer's "Forgive Me". Whelchel did not record a second album.

References

External links

1984 albums
Lisa Whelchel albums
Sparrow Records albums